Three Imaginary Boys is the debut studio album by English rock band the Cure, released on 11 May 1979 by Fiction Records. It was later released in the United States, Canada, and Australia with a different track listing as a compilation album titled Boys Don't Cry.

Release 

Three Imaginary Boys was released on 11 May 1979 by record label Fiction. The record company decided which songs were put on the album, as well as the cover artwork, without Robert Smith's consent. For all Cure albums since, Smith has ensured that he is given complete creative control over the final product before it goes on sale. The "Foxy Lady" soundcheck, with vocals sung by Michael Dempsey, was not supposed to be on the album, and was removed for the American release. Smith has stated that "songs like 'Object' and 'World War' and our cover of 'Foxy Lady' were Chris Parry's choice".

The album was reissued on 29 November 2004 and featured a second disc of unreleased material, including songs recorded under the band name Easy Cure with Porl Thompson. It was originally supposed to be released in early 2004 along with the band's next three studio albums (Seventeen Seconds, Faith and Pornography), but was delayed multiple times before being released by itself at the end of 2004. As it featured a variety of old songs, it was the only Deluxe Edition by the band that did not include an alternate version of each song on the first disc. Some of the early booklets in the reissue had missing lyrics, which were made available on the Cure's website in PDF form. All copies since contain the lyrics. A one-disc reissue was released on 5 September 2005, containing only the original album. It was also released in the standard jewel case rather than in a box. In some countries, the Deluxe Edition has become a collector's item as production was phased out, being replaced by the more economic single-disc version.

Reception 

Despite Smith's displeasure with the record, Three Imaginary Boys was well received critically at the time of its release. Sounds Dave McCullough praised it in a 5-star review and noted: "The Cure are going somewhere different on each track, the ideas are startling and disarming." McCullough noted the variety of the material and qualified "Grinding Halt" as a "pop song that reminds you of the Isley Brothers or the Buzzcocks." Red Starr, writing in Smash Hits, described the album as a "brilliant, compelling debut." However, NMEs Paul Morley did not share the same point of view and wrote: "Most of the time, it's a voice catching its breath, a cautiously primitive riff guitar, toy drumming and a sprightly bass."

Chris True of AllMusic retrospectively called the album "a very strong debut" and a "semi-detached bit of late-'70s English pop-punk". Nitsuh Abebe of Pitchfork likened the album to a "new wave Wire... [or] Joy Division" and called it "as original a record as anything else to spin off from the tail end of punk." He also called the album "spiky post-punk." BBC Music critic Simon Morgan said "Smith was forging his own take on the post-punk zeitgeist," while author Martin C. Strong said it "remains among the Cure's finest work," adding that "their strangely accessible post-punk snippets lent an air of suppressed melancholy." The album was also described as "a collection of melodic but slightly kooky power-pop" by Chris Gerard of PopMatters.

Track listing 

Note
The album included an uncredited, final instrumental track informally called "The Weedy Burton". This fact was not acknowledged until the Deluxe Edition reissue.

Personnel 
 The Cure

 Robert Smith – guitar, lead vocals (all but "Foxy Lady"), harmonica ("Subway Song")
 Michael Dempsey – bass, backing and lead ("Foxy Lady") vocals
 Lol Tolhurst – drums

 Additional personnel

 Porl Thompson – lead guitar, backing vocals (1–4, 6, 7 of bonus disc)

 Technical

 David Dragon – sleeve illustrations
 Michael J. Dutton – "assistant"
 Martyn Goddard – sleeve photography
 Mike Hedges – engineering
 Connie Jude – sleeve illustrations
Chris Parry – production
 Bill Smith – art direction, sleeve design, additional photography

References

External links 

 

The Cure albums
Fiction Records albums
1979 debut albums
Rhino Records albums
Albums recorded at Morgan Sound Studios
Power pop albums by English artists